Kjell Peersman (born 21 May 2004) is a Belgian professional footballer who plays as a goalkeeper for PSV.

Career
Peersman began playing football at Westerlo, and moved to the youth academy of PSV in 2014. On 22 June 2020, he signed his first professional contract at PSV until 2023. He was promoted to the Jong PSV for the 2021-22 season, although a knee injury ruled him until the second half of the season. He debuted with Jong PSV in a 5–1 Eerste Divisie win over Almere City FC on 10 January 2022.

Personal life
Peersman is the son of the retired Belgium international goalkeeper Tristan Peersman.

References

External links
 Profile at the PSV Eindhoven website
 
 ACFF Profile

2004 births
Living people
People from Wilrijk
Belgian footballers
Belgium youth international footballers
PSV Eindhoven players
Jong PSV players
Eredivisie players
Eerste Divisie players
Association football goalkeepers
Belgian expatriate footballers
Belgian expatriates in the Netherlands
Expatriate footballers in the Netherlands